The 1980–81 Segunda División season saw 20 teams participate in the second flight Spanish league. CD Castellón, Cádiz CF and Racing de Santander were promoted to Primera División. Granada CF, Palencia CF, Barakaldo CF and AgD Ceuta were relegated to Segunda División B.

Teams

Final table

Results

Pichichi Trophy for top goalscorers

References 

Segunda División seasons
2
Spain